John Wier may refer to:

 John Wier (politician) (died 1861), Nova Scotia judge and politician
 Johann Weyer (1515–1588), Dutch physician, occultist, and demonologist

See also 

 John Weir (disambiguation)